Harald Gundersen (11 October 1905 – 7 November 1979) was a Norwegian footballer. He played in two matches for the Norway national football team in 1929.

References

External links
 

1905 births
1979 deaths
Norwegian footballers
Norway international footballers
Place of birth missing
Association footballers not categorized by position